Park Soo-yun (born 27 November 1974) is a South Korean badminton player. She competed in women's doubles at the 1996 Summer Olympics in Atlanta.

References

External links

1974 births
Living people
South Korean female badminton players
Olympic badminton players of South Korea
Badminton players at the 1996 Summer Olympics